Articles of Federation can refer to:
Document that created the United Federation of Planets in Star Trek
The Star Trek novel Articles of the Federation by Keith R.A. DeCandido